How to Kill and Be Killed (2005) is a live concert DVD from singer-songwriter Derek Webb. The full-band show was recorded at the Nashville performance space Rocketown, at the release party for his second solo studio album, I See Things Upside Down.

Title
The title, "How to Kill and Be Killed," comes from a line in Webb's song "Lover Part 2":

Webb remarked on the theme and meaning behind the phrase, "I've found that often success looks more like failure, riches more like poverty and real life often feels more like death. The Christian life is very literally the process by which we are killed."

Special features
The special features on the DVD include a photo gallery of the concert, and an extended multi-part interview with Webb. Much of what he says foreshadows the message of his follow-up album, 2005's Mockingbird, addressing topics such as politics and religion, the nature of Christian art, and the role the artist plays in society.

Track listing

Personnel
Derek Webb – lead vocals, acoustic and electric guitars
Cason Cooley – vocals, piano, keyboards, guitar, philosophy and theology
Mark Polack – bass guitar
Will Sayles – drums and percussion
Paul Moak – electric guitar, slide guitar, EBow, pedal steel guitar, keyboards, Hammond organ, vibraphone, programming

References
 

Derek Webb albums
2005 live albums
2005 video albums
Live video albums